Al-Hasakah Subdistrict  is a subdistrict of al-Hasakah District in central al-Hasakah Governorate, northeastern Syria. The administrative centre is the city of al-Hasakah. It has a mixed population of Kurds, Assyrians, and Arabs. Most of the subdistrict is part of the Autonomous Administration of North and East Syria, apart from an enclave of Hasakah city, which has remained under the control of the Syrian government since the beginning of the Syrian civil war.

At the 2004 census, the subdistrict had a population of 251,570.

Cities, towns and villages

Civil war 

Following the Battle of Shaddadi in February 2013, in which the city of Al-Shaddadah came under the control of al-Nusra Front, the southern parts of Al-Hasakah Subdistrict also fell to Nusra. The Islamic State of Iraq and the Levant (ISIL) took over from al-Nusra Front in the area, and pushed northwards up to the boundary of Hasakah city, culminating in the 2015 Battle of al-Hasakah. ISIL were finally driven from the district in the Al-Shaddadi offensive (2016).

Kawkab military base 
Surrounding Mount Kawkab (at 36.536251°N, 40.858276°E) is the largest military base of the governorate, which has remained in the hands of the Syrian Army throughout the war. ISIS attacked the base without success in July 2014 and October 2015.

References 

Al-Hasakah District
al-Hasakah